Qurchay or Qur Chay may refer to:
 Qurchay, Azadshahr
 Qur Chay, Ramian